The events of 1986 in anime.

Accolades 
Ōfuji Noburō Award: Castle in the Sky

Releases

Further reading
Thirty Years Ago: The Best Anime of 1986 by Daryl Surat on Anime News Network

See also
1986 in animation

References

External links 
Japanese animated works of the year, listed in the IMDb

Anime
Anime
Years in anime